A Son from America (French:Un fils d'Amérique) is a 1925 French silent comedy film directed by Henri Fescourt and starring Gabriel Gabrio, Henri Debain and Alice Tissot. It was remade as a sound film of the same title.

Cast
 Gabriel Gabrio as Léon Verton  
 Henri Debain 
 Marie-Louise Iribe 
 Alice Tissot 
 Paulette Berger
 Max Bonnet (actor) 
 Albert Bras 
 Léon Courtois
 Gilbert Dacheux
 Guerineau 
 Émile Saint-Ober

References

External links 
 

1925 films
French comedy films
1925 comedy films
French silent films
Films directed by Henri Fescourt
French films based on plays
French black-and-white films
1920s French films